Aleksandar Pantić may refer to:

 Aleksandar Pantić (footballer, born 1978), Serbian footballer
 Aleksandar Pantić (footballer, born 1992), Serbian footballer currently playing in Cádiz CF